Khristian Lander (born August 9, 2002) is an American college basketball player for the Western Kentucky Hilltoppers of the Conference USA. He previously played for the Indiana Hoosiers of the Big Ten Conference.

High school career
Lander played basketball for FJ Reitz High School in Evansville, Indiana. As a junior, he averaged 21 points, six rebounds and 4.6 assists per game, earning MaxPreps Junior All-American third team honors. Lander finished his high school career with 1,314 points. He also played on the AAU circuit with Indiana Elite, where he built a relationship with future college teammates Trey Galloway and Anthony Leal.

Recruiting
Lander was a consensus five-star recruit, according to major recruiting services. On February 25, 2020, he announced his commitment to Indiana over offers from Louisville, Memphis and Michigan, among others. On May 18, it was announced that Lander, originally a member of the 2021 class, would reclassify to the 2020 class. He made the decision in part because he wanted to play with Trayce Jackson-Davis.

College career
As a freshman, Lander averaged 2.1 points and 1.2 assists per game. After the season, he initially entered the transfer portal due to the firing of coach Archie Miller, but opted to remain at Indiana when the school hired Mike Woodson. On February 8, 2022, Lander was one of five players suspended by Woodson for breaking team rules. Lander was reinstated on February 10, after missing one game.

Career statistics

College

|-
| style="text-align:left;"| 2020–21
| style="text-align:left;"| Indiana
| 26 || 0 || 10.1 || .257 || .273 || .875 || .8 || 1.2 || .3 || .2 || 2.1
|-
| style="text-align:left;"| 2021-22
| style="text-align:left;"| Indiana
| 13 || 0 || 8.8 || .452 || .526 || .750 || .8 || 0.9 || .3 || .1 || 2.9
|-
| style="text-align:left;"| Career
| style="text-align:left;"| 
| 39 || 0 || 9.7 || .317 || .356 || .813 || .8 || 1.1 || .3 || .1 || 2.4

Personal life
Lander is the son of Keith and Brandie Lander. He and his father have matching tattoos of their initials, depicting a prince crown and a king crown, respectively.

References

External links
Indiana Hoosiers bio
USA Basketball bio

2002 births
Living people
American men's basketball players
Basketball players from Indiana
Point guards
Sportspeople from Evansville, Indiana